Ruslan Serafymovych Tarpan (born 14 August 1971) is a Ukrainian businessman, living in the United Arab Emirates. The founder of the "Incor-Group" company, Tarpan served as a member of the Odesa City Council from 1994 to 2010, and was heavily involved in the rebuilding of monuments in Odesa.

Early life and foundation of Incor Group 
Ruslan Serafymovych Tarpan was born on 14 August 1971 in Odesa, then in the Ukrainian Soviet Socialist Republic of the Soviet Union, and earned a PhD in economics. From 1994 to 2010, Tarpan served as a member of the Odesa City Council.

Tarpan founded the Incor Group development company in 1997, specializing in commercial and residential construction, engineering and restoration of historical buildings.

Odesan cultural heritage 
Tarpan achieved significant attention in Ukraine due to his support for restoration of cultural heritage in Odesa. Among his most significant and controversial projects was the restoration of the Monument to the founders of Odessa and the reconstruction of the nearby Yekaterinskaya Square. During the monument's restoration, protests against it were held by Ukrainian nationalists, Cossack groups and Orthodox priests. The monument continued to remain controversial, with protesters unsuccessfully petitioning for its destruction following the 2014 Revolution of Dignity and the start of the 2022 Russian invasion of Ukraine. In November 2022 the Odesa City 
Council decided that the monument to the founders of Odesa would be dismantled and temporarily moved to the Odesa Fine Arts Museum.

References 

1971 births
Living people
Businesspeople from Odesa
Politicians from Odesa
Ukrainian philanthropists
Odesa National Economics University alumni